Mechtronix Inc.  was a Canadian company specializing in the manufacture of flight simulation training devices (FSTD) for commercial, general and business aviation. The company was founded in 1987 based in Montreal, Canada. The company was acquired by Textron in 2013 and was merged into TRU Simulation + Training.

History
In the middle of the microprocessor revolution, in an R&D lab at Montreal’s Concordia University, the company started as an engineering consultancy group specializing in all aspects of microprocessor industrial applications.

Products & Services
Mechtronix manufactures a complete line of training devices for general, business and commercial aviation. The product family includes Full Flight Simulators Level D, FNPTs (Flight and Navigation Procedures Trainers) and FTDs (Flight Training Devices). With research and development at the core of Mechtronix's culture, new products are introduced to the market to meet unmet needs such as the FFT X, an exact replica of the FFS without a motion base. Mechtronix simulated aircraft range from small single-engine training airplanes, such as the Cessna 172 to commercial airplanes, such as the Boeing 737, Airbus 320 & 330, ATR 42/72.

Awards
Mechtronix has received numerous appraisals and awards for innovations introduced to the aviation training market through in-house research & development, exporting strategies and product quality.

- Les Mercuriades - Fédération des chambres de commerce du Québec
- Business of the Year (2007)
- Export Award (2007)
- Innovation Award (2006)

References

Technology companies of Canada
Companies based in Montreal
1987 establishments in Quebec
Canadian companies established in 1987
Technology companies established in 1987